Greenhouse gas emissions by China are the largest of any country in the world both in production and consumption terms, and stem mainly from coal burning in China, including coal-fired power stations, coal mining, and blast furnaces producing iron and steel. When measuring production-based emissions, China emitted over 14 gigatonnes (Gt) CO2eq of greenhouse gases in 2019, 27% of the world total. When measuring in consumption-based terms, which adds emissions associated with imported goods and extracts those associated with exported goods, China accounts for 13 gigatonnes (Gt) or 25% of global emissions.

Despite having the largest emissions in the world, China's large population means its per person emissions have remained considerably lower than those in the developed world. This corresponds to over 10.1 tonnes CO2eq emitted per person each year, slightly over the world average and the EU average but significantly lower than the second largest emitter of greenhouse gases, the United States, with its 17.6 tonnes per person. Accounting for historic emissions, OECD countries produced four times more CO2 in cumulative emissions than China, due to developed countries' early start in industrialization.

The targets laid out in China's Nationally Determined Contribution in 2016 will likely be met, but are not enough to properly combat global warming. China has committed to peak emissions by 2030 and net zero by 2060. In order to limit warming to 1.5 degrees C coal plants in China without carbon capture must be phased out by 2045. China continues to build coal-fired power stations in 2020 and promised to "phase down" coal use from 2026.

Greenhouse gas sources 

Since 2006, China has been the world's largest emitter of  annually. According to estimates provided by the Netherlands Environmental Assessment Agency, China's carbon dioxide emissions in 2006 amounted to 6.2 billion tons, and the United States' co-production in the same year was 5.8 billion tons. In 2006, China's carbon dioxide emissions were 8 percent higher than America's, the agency said. The U.S. emitted 2% more carbon dioxide in 2005 than China. China ratified the Kyoto Protocol as a non-Annex B party without binding targets, and ratified the Paris Agreement to fight climate change. As the world's largest coal producer and consumer country, China worked hard to change energy structure and experienced a decrease in coal consumption since 2013 to 2016. However, China, the United States and India, the three biggest coal users, have increased coal mining in 2017. The Chinese government has implemented several policies to control coal consumption, and boosted the usage of natural gas and electricity . Looking ahead, the construction and manufacturing industries of China will give way to the service industry, and the Chinese government will not set a higher goal for economic growth in 2018; thus coal consumption may not experience continuous growth in the next few years.

In 2019 China is estimated to have emitted 27% of world GhG, followed by the US with 11%, then India with 6.6%.

China is implementing some policies to mitigate the bad effects of climate change, most of which aim to constrain coal consumption. The Nationally Determined Contribution (NDC) of China set goals and committed to peak CO2 emissions by 2030 in the latest, and increase the use of non-fossil fuel energy carriers, taking up 20% of the total primary energy supply. If China successfully reached NDC's targets, the GHG emissions level would be 12.8–14.3 Gte in 2030, reducing 64% to 70% of emission intensity below 2005 levels. China has surpassed solar deployment and wind energy deployment targets for 2020.

Energy production 

Power is estimated as the largest emitter with 27% of 2020 green house gases. Most electricity in China comes from coal, which accounted for 65% of the electricity generation mix in 2019. Electricity generation by renewables has been increasing, with construction of wind and solar plants doubling from 2019 to 2020.

According to a major 2020 study by Energy Foundation China, in order to limit warming to 1.5 degrees C, coal plants without carbon capture must be phased out by 2045.

Transport was estimated in 2021 to be less than 10% of the country's emissions but growing.

Energy consumption  
According to the 2016 Chinese Statistical Yearbook published by China's National Bureau of Statistics, China's energy consumption was 430,000 (10,000 tons of Standard Coal Equivalent), including 64% coal, 18.1% crude oil, 5.9% natural gas, 12.0% primary electricity, and other energy. Since 2011, the percentage of coal has decreased, and the percentage of crude oil, natural gas, primary electricity, and other energy have increased.

China experienced an increase in electricity demand and usage in 2017 as the economy accelerated. According to the Climate Data Explorer published by World Resources Institute, China, the European Union, and the U.S. contributed to more than 50% of global greenhouse gas emissions. In 2016, China's greenhouse gas emissions accounted for 26% of total global emissions. The energy industry has been the biggest contributor to greenhouse gas emissions since the last decade.

Although China has large countrywide emissions, its per capita carbon dioxide emissions are still lower than those of some other developed and developing countries.

Industry 

Manufacturing industry is estimated at 19% of 2020 emissions.

Cement 
Cement is estimated to be 15% of emissions but only a tenth of  companies are reporting data as of 2021.

Iron and steel 
Steel is estimated at 15% to 20% of emissions and consolidation of the industry may help.

Agriculture 
Agriculture is estimated at 13% of 2020 GHG. Slightly over half of agricultural emissions are estimated to be nitrous oxide and almost all the rest methane.

Waste 
Waste is estimated at 6% of 2020 emissions. Most municipal solid waste is sent to landfill.

Coal mine methane 
China is by far the largest emitter of methane from coal mines.

Mitigation 
A 2011 Lawrence Berkeley National Laboratory report predicted that Chinese  emissions will peak around 2030. This because in many areas such as infrastructure, housing, commercial building, appliances per household, fertilizers, and cement production a maximum intensity will be reached and replacement will take the place of new demand. The 2030 emissions peak also became China's pledge at the Paris COP21 summit. Carbon emission intensity may decrease as policies become strengthened and more effectively implemented, including by more effective financial incentives, and as less carbon intensive energy supplies are deployed. In a "baseline" computer model  emissions were predicted to peak in 2033; in an "Accelerated Improvement Scenario" they were predicted to peak in 2027. China also established 10 binding environmental targets in its Thirteenth Five-Year Plan (2016-2020).  These include an aim to reduce carbon intensity by 18% by 2020, as well as a binding target for renewable energy at 15% of total energy, raised from under 12% in the Twelfth Five-Year Plan. According to BloombergNEF the levelized cost of electricity from new large-scale solar power has been below existing coal-fired power stations since 2021.

Policy 

The climate change mitigation policy in China is an important environmental protection strategy since the 2010s after rapid domestic developments. Having emitted the second-largest amount of greenhouse gas and having the most people, China published a series of policies and laws to mitigate environmental impacts, such as reduce atmospheric pollution, transition from fossil fuels to renewable energy, and achieve carbon neutrality.

In the past 20 years, China has published 4 legislative laws and 5 executive plans as outlines regarding the climate change issues. Government departments and local governments also developed their own special plans and implementation methods based on the national outline. In 2015 China joined the Paris Agreement to globally constrain the temperature rise and greenhouse gas emission.

In 2020 China created the 14th FYP(Five Year Plan) . The key climate- and energy-related ideas in the FYP will be critical to China's energy transition and global efforts to tackle climate change.

In April, 2021, the United States and China decided to cooperate and reduce the global climate change. Series of international and domestic mitigation and adaption strategies was published based on the Paris Agreement.

Policy and Law

Forest Law of the People's Republic of China (1998) 
The aim of this law was to conserve and rationally exploit forest resources. It accelerated territorial afforestation and cultivation while also ensuring forest product management, production, and supply in order to meet socialist construction requirements.

Energy Conservation Law (2007) 
The aim of this law was to strengthen energy conservation, especially for key energy-using institutions, as well as to encourage energy efficiency and energy-saving technology. The legislation allowed the government to promote and facilitate the use of renewable energy in a variety of applications.

Renewable Energy Act (2009) 
This Act outlines the responsibilities of the government, businesses, and other users in the production and use of renewable energy. It includes policies and targets relating to mandatory grid connectivity, market control legislation, differentiated pricing, special funds, and tax reliefs, as well as a target of 15 percent renewable energy by 2020.

12th Five-Year Plan (2011-2015) 

The 12th Five-Year Plan sought to make domestic consumption and development more economically equitable and environmentally friendly. It also shifted the economy's focus away from heavy industry and resource-intensive manufacturing and into a more consumer-driven, resource-efficient economy.

The National Strategy for Climate Change Adaptation (2013) 
The strategy established clear guidelines and principles for adapting to and mitigating climate change. It includes interventions such as early-warning identification and information-sharing systems at the national and regional levels, an ocean disaster monitoring system, and coastal restoration to protect water supplies, reduce soil erosion, and improve disaster prevention.

National Plan For Tackling Climate Change (2014-2020) 
The National Plan For Tackling Climate Change is a national law that includes prevention, adaptation, scientific study, and public awareness. By 2020, China plans to reduce carbon emissions per unit of GDP by 40-45 percent compared to 2005 levels, raise the share of non-fossil fuels in primary energy consumption to 15%, and increase forest area and stock volume by 40 million hectares and 1.3 million m3, respectively, compared to 2005 levels.

Energy Development Strategy Action Plan (2014-2020) 
This plan aimed to reduce China's high energy consumption per unit of GDP through a series of steps and mandatory goals, encouraging more productive, self-sufficient, renewable, and creative energy production and consumption.

Law on the Prevention and Control of Atmospheric Pollution (2016) 
The aim of this law is to preserve and improve the environment, prevent and regulate air pollution, protect public health, advance ecological civilization, and promote economic and social growth that is sustainable. It demands that robust emission control initiatives be implemented against the pollution caused by the burning of coal, industrial production, motor vehicles and vessels, dust as well as agricultural activities.

13th Five-Year Plan (2016-2020) 

The 13th Five Year Plan published the strategy and pathway for China's development during 2016-2020 and set specific environmental and productivity goals. Peak goals for carbon emissions, energy use, and water use were established in the 13th Five Year Plan. It also stated objectives for increasing industry productivity, removing obsolete or overcapacity production facilities, increasing renewable energy production, and improving green infrastructure.

Mitigation Approach

Emissions Trading

Vehicles 
Vehicles account for around 8% of the heat-trapping gases released annually in China. As the Chinese vehicle stock rises and heavy manufacturing as a percentage of the overall economy declines, this percentage will rise in the coming years. Fuel performance regulations and funding for electric vehicles are two of the Chinese government's key policies on vehicle emissions. The government refers to vehicles fueled by non-petroleum fuels as "new energy vehicles," or "NEVs." Almost all NEVs in China today are battery-powered plug-in electric vehicles.

Future Plans

14th Five Year Plan (2021-2025) 
The 14th FYP(Five Year Plan) was created in September, 2020 as the key climate- and energy-related plan that is critical to China's energy transition and global efforts to tackle climate change.

On September 22, 2020, Chinese leader Xi Jinping stated: "China will increase its nationally determined contributions, adopt more powerful policies and measures, strive to reach the peak of carbon dioxide emissions by 2030, and strive to achieve carbon neutrality by 2060."

Of particular interest is how China will integrate into the FYP to achieve peak carbon before 2030 and carbon neutrality by 2060. The plan will be seen by many as a test of how seriously the pledge is being taken at the policy level.

Unlike most nations that have committed to carbon neutrality, China's economy grows rapidly. China is still a developing country and, as of 2020, growth was still linked to carbon emissions. In the 14th Five Year Plan, the Chinese government revealed climate mitigation goals including higher share of non-fossil fuels in the energy mix, reduction of  emissions per unit of GDP, carbon cap for the power sector, reduction of fine particle pollution in key cities, and greater forest coverage. These goals cover industrial production, transportation, forestry, and citizens’ daily life aspects.

U.S.-China Cooperation 
On April 15 and 16, 2021, U.S. Special Presidential Envoy for Climate John Kerry and China Special Envoy for Climate Change Xie Zhenhua met in Shanghai to discuss aspects of the climate crisis. U.S. and China Finally released joint statement and decided to cooperating with each other and with other countries to tackle the climate crisis. According to the joint statement on U.S. Department of State, "This includes both enhancing their respective actions and cooperating in multilateral processes, including the United Nations Framework Convention on Climate Change and the Paris Agreement."

In short term, The United States and China take following actions to further address the climate crisis:

 Both countries intend to develop by COP 26 in Glasgow their respective long-term strategies aimed at net zero GHG emissions/carbon neutrality.
 Both countries intend to take appropriate actions to maximize international investment and finance in support of the transition from carbon-intensive fossil fuel based energy to green, low-carbon and renewable energy in developing countries.
 They will each implement the phasedown of hydrofluorocarbon production and consumption reflected in the Kigali Amendment to the Montreal Protocol.

In addition, both countries will continue to discuss concrete actions in the 2020s to reduce emissions aimed at keeping the Paris Agreement-aligned temperature limit within reach. Potential areas include policies, measures, and technologies to decarbonize industry and power; Increased deployment of renewable energy; Green and climate resilient agriculture; Energy efficient buildings; Green, low-carbon transportation; Cooperation on addressing emissions of methane and other non- greenhouse gases; Cooperation on addressing emissions from international civil aviation and maritime activities; and other near-term policies and measures, including with respect to reducing emissions from coal, oil, and gas.

Energy efficiency 
In 2004, Premier Wen Jiabao promised to use an "iron hand" to make China more energy efficient.

Energy efficiency improvements have somewhat offset increases in energy output as China continues to develop. Since 2006, the Chinese government has increased export taxes on energy-inefficient industries, reduced import tariffs on certain non-renewable energy resources, and closed down a number of inefficient power and industrial plants. In 2009, for example, for every two new plants (in terms of energy generation capacity) built, one inefficient plant was closed. China is unique in its closing of so many inefficient plants.

Renewable energy 

China is the world's leading investor in wind turbines and other renewable energy technologies and produces more wind turbines and solar panels each year than any other country.

As the current largest greenhouse gas contributor in the world, coal burning is the major cause of global warming in China. Therefore, China has tried to transit from fossil fuels toward renewable energy since 2010.

China is the world leader in renewable energy deployment, with more than twice the ability of any other nation. China accounted for 43% of global renewable energy capacity additions in 2018. For decades, hydropower has been a major source of energy in China. In the last ten years, wind and solar power have risen significantly. Renewables accounted for approximately a quarter of China's electricity generation in 2018, with 18% coming from hydropower, 5% from wind, and 3% from solar.

Nuclear power is planned to be rapidly expanded. By mid-century fast neutron reactors are seen as the main nuclear power technology which allows much more efficient use of fuel resources.

China has also dictated tough new energy standards for lighting and gas kilometrage for cars. China could push electric cars to curb its dependence on imported petroleum (oil) and foreign automobile technology.

Co-benefits 
Like India, cutting greenhouse gas emissions together with air pollution in China, saves enough lives to easily cover the cost.

Impact of 2019–20 coronavirus outbreak 

A temporary slowdown in manufacturing, construction, transportation, and overall economic activity during the beginning of the 2019–20 coronavirus outbreak reduced China's greenhouse gas emissions by "about a quarter," as reported in February 2020. Nonetheless, for the year April 1, 2020 – March 31, 2021, China's  emissions reached a record high: nearly 12 billion metric tons. Additionally, China's carbon emissions during the first quarter of 2021 were higher than in the first quarters of both 2019 and 2020.

Targets 
The targets laid out in China's Intended Nationally Determined Contribution (INDC) in 2016 will likely be met, but are not enough to properly combat global warming. China also established 10 binding environmental targets in its Thirteenth Five-Year Plan (2016-2020).  These include an aim to reduce carbon intensity by 18% by 2020, as well as a binding target for renewable energy at 15% of total energy, raised from under 12% in the Twelfth Five-Year Plan. The Thirteenth Five-Year Plan also set, for the first time, a cap on total energy use from all sources: no more than 5 billion tons of coal through 2020.

See also

Debate over China's economic responsibilities for climate change mitigation
 List of countries by greenhouse gas emissions

References

Sources

External links 

China
Climate change in China